Irene Yah-Ling Sun (born September 1, 1946) is an American actor. She is best known for her appearance as judoka Myrna Wong in the 1978 film Harper Valley PTA.

Early life
Sun was born on September 1, 1946 in Shanghai, China and raised in Taiwan; her family later moved to Manhattan, where she studied ballet.

Career
Sun made her stage debut as a dancer in Flower Drum Song, followed by The World of Suzie Wong.

Sun was a series regular in the short-lived Khan! (1975), as Anna, the daughter of the titular character (played by Khigh Dhiegh), helping her father solve crimes alongside her brother Kim (played by Evan C. Kim). Other television guest spots include appearances in Hawaii Five-O, The Rockford Files, and Quincy, M.E.

She also helped assemble an extensive collection of memorabilia depicting how Asian Americans have been portrayed in popular culture along with her friend, the film editor, writer, and book dealer Yoshio Kishi. The collection was acquired by the Asian/Pacific/American Studies Program and Institute of New York University in 2003, and a portion was exhibited in 2005 as "Archivist of the 'Yellow Peril, at NYU (Feb 3 – Jul 31) and MoCA (Aug 16 – Dec 31).

In 2017, Sun appeared in a nonspeaking role (as "Grandma") in a short public service spot commissioned by DDB San Francisco for Energy Upgrade California, directed by Bradley G Munkowitz (GMUNK).

Personal life 
She is an accomplished chef, specializing in Chinese dishes.

Filmography

References

External links
 

1946 births
Living people
American film actresses
American television actresses
20th-century American actresses
21st-century American actresses
Chinese emigrants to the United States
Chinese Civil War refugees
Actresses from Shanghai
American actresses of Chinese descent
20th-century American dancers